Tyler James Bennett (born 22 July 1992), better known as T.J. Bennett, is a Canadian born, American professional baseball player who is a free agent.

TJ played college baseball at Oral Roberts University and University of Utah. Undrafted, he played independent baseball in the Frontier League with the Schaumburg Boomers and the American Association of Professional Baseball with the Joplin Blasters before player winter ball in the Australian Baseball League with the Brisbane Bandits. After signing with the San Francisco Giants prior the 2016 season, he played three seasons before being released and rejoining teams in the American Association.

In his five seasons with the Brisbane Bandits, Bennett first held the single-season homerun record following the 2017–18 Australian Baseball League season where he hit 16 in 37 games and then broke the record again in the 2022–23 Australian Baseball League season with 17 homeruns in 40 games.

External links

ABL.com stats

1992 births
Living people
Brisbane Bandits players